The  is the 28th edition of the Japan Academy Film Prize, an award presented by the Nippon Academy-Sho Association to award excellence in filmmaking. It awarded the best films of 2004 and it took place on February 18, 2005 at the Grand Prince Hotel New Takanawa in Tokyo, Japan.

Nominees

Awards

References

External links 
  - 
 Complete list of awards and nominations for the 28th Japan Academy Prize - 

Japan Academy Film Prize
2005 in Japanese cinema
Japan Academy Film Prize
February 2005 events in Japan